Yanomamia guianensis is a South American lizard of the family Gymnophthalmidae. It has been found only at higher elevations on Mount Ayanganna and Mount Roraima in west-central Guyana.

References

guianensis
Reptiles of Guyana
Endemic fauna of Guyana
Reptiles described in 2001
Taxa named by Ross Douglas MacCulloch
Taxa named by Amy Lathrop
Taxobox binomials not recognized by IUCN